The 2015 Crescent Women World Cup Vårgårda Team time trial featured as the eighth round of the 2015 UCI Women's Road World Cup.

Results

World Cup Standings

References

Crescent Women World Cup Vargarda TTT
Crescent Women World Cup Vargarda TTT
Open de Suède Vårgårda
August 2015 sports events in Europe